Once a week may refer to:

 Once a Week (magazine), a nineteenth century British magazine
 Once a Week (book) (1914), a collection of short stories by A. A. Milne
 "Once a Week Won't Kill You" (1944), a short story by J. D. Salinger
 The Once a Week Show (2007–2008), an Irish television series presented by Dustin the Turkey
 Collier's, an American magazine originally titled Once a Week